Lindsay Pulsipher (born May 6, 1979) is an American actress. She has had several roles in film and television and is known for her series regular role as Rose Lawrence on A&E Network's The Beast (2009). She joined the third season of HBO's True Blood (2010), playing were-panther Crystal Norris and love interest to Jason Stackhouse. She has a recurring role as Detective Amanda Rollins’ troubled sister, Kim, on NBC's Law & Order: Special Victims Unit.

Childhood
Lindsay Pulsipher was born and grew up in Salt Lake City, Utah, with five siblings, and was inspired to be an actor by her mother, a theater actress. As she puts it:  She was influenced by Julie Christie and Audrey Hepburn, who showed her "a whole new world as far as acting goes".

Pulsipher's parents were members of the Church of Jesus Christ of Latter-day Saints, but she has since stopped practicing the religion.

Career
After appearing in several roles from 2000 to 2003 in the television series, Touched by an Angel, filmed in her hometown of Salt Lake City, and after starring in a couple of indie films, Pulsipher moved to Los Angeles to pursue a lifelong dream of a career in acting.

She was given several guest starring roles in popular television series including House, M.D., CSI: NY (Crime Scene Investigation: New York) and NCIS: Naval Criminal Investigative Service, and eventually received a regular role with Patrick Swayze in The Beast (2009). She took the role of Crystal Norris beginning with the third season of the True Blood (2010). She has starred in two features directed by Calvin Reeder: The Oregonian (2011), and The Rambler (2013), and most recently, she guest-starred as Kim Rollins, Amanda Rollins' troubled sister on Law & Order: Special Victims Unit.

Pulsipher was confirmed as the replacement for Hilary Duff as Bonnie Parker in the remake of The Bonnie and Clyde Story, but she was later replaced with English actress Holliday Grainger.

Quotes

Filmography

Film

Television

References

External links

American film actresses
Living people
Actresses from Salt Lake City
21st-century American actresses
American television actresses
1979 births